The McKee Button Company is a historic building in Muscatine, Iowa, United States. The city was known as the Pearl Button Capital of the World because of the numerous firms that produced the buttons here through the 1960s. The Peerless Button Company was established by James McKee and his brother-in-law William Bliven in 1895. Two years later the company's name was changed to the McKee and Bliven Button Company. They built this building in 1907. The company has been known as the McKee Button Company since 1925. The building was listed on the National Register of Historic Places in 2020.

References

Industrial buildings completed in 1907
Industrial buildings and structures on the National Register of Historic Places in Iowa
National Register of Historic Places in Muscatine County, Iowa
Buildings and structures in Muscatine, Iowa
1895 establishments in Iowa